Scudderia is a genus of katydids in the subfamily Phaneropterinae. They are sometimes called bush katydids and are 30-38 mm in length. Their range is most of North America, northernmost being in Southern Canada. They are herbivores, with nymphs feeding primarily on flowers and adults preferring woody deciduous plants.

Species
 Scudderia beckeri Piza, 1967
 Scudderia bivittata Piza, 1976
 Scudderia chelata Piza, 1980
 Scudderia cuneata Morse, 1901
 Scudderia curvicauda (De Geer, 1773)
 Scudderia dentata Brunner von Wattenwyl, 1878
 Scudderia fasciata Beutenmüller, 1894
 Scudderia furcata Brunner von Wattenwyl, 1878
 Scudderia intermedia Márquez Mayaudón, 1958
 Scudderia mexicana (Saussure, 1861)
 Scudderia pallens (Fabricius, 1787)
 Scudderia paraensis Piza, 1980
 Scudderia paronae Griffini, 1896
 Scudderia pistillata Brunner von Wattenwyl, 1878 – broadwinged bush katydid
 Scudderia salesopolensis Piza, 1980
 Scudderia septentrionalis (Serville, 1838)
 Scudderia surinama Piza, 1980
 Scudderia texensis Saussure & Pictet, 1897
 Scudderia trombetana Piza, 1980
 Scudderia ungulata Scudder, 1898
 Scudderia williamsi Piza, 1974

References

 
Phaneropterinae
Tettigoniidae genera